The Springfield Model 1835 was a .69 caliber flintlock musket manufactured in the United States during the early 19th century.

The Model 1835 was manufactured by the Springfield and Harpers Ferry armories and also produced by other independent contractors. It was a smoothbore musket and fired a .69 caliber round ball. The Model 1835 is sometimes considered to be its own model number, but is often considered to be just a continuation of the Springfield Model 1816 designated as the Type III. The barrel was slightly longer than the Model 1816 and the total weight of the Model 1835 was slightly higher, but otherwise the Model 1835 was very similar to the Model 1816. Even though the final product was very similar, significantly different manufacturing techniques were used in the creation of the Model 1835, and a great deal of emphasis was placed on parts interchangeability. This paved the way for the Springfield Model 1842 which was the first musket to be constructed of all interchangeable parts.

Most Model 1835 muskets had their flintlocks replaced with a percussion lock during the 1840s and 1850s. Some of the Model 1835 muskets also had their barrels rifled during this same period, if the barrel was deemed thick enough to be structurally sound.

The Model 1835 was used in the Mexican–American War. The Model 1835 was also used by both the North and South during the American Civil War.

See also
 Springfield musket

References

External links

Springfield firearms
Muskets
American Civil War weapons
Weapons of the Confederate States of America